Charles Trueman (1814–1879) was a British Liberal and Whig politician.

Trueman was elected Whig MP for Helston unopposed at the 1857 general election, but lost the seat at the next election in 1859 when he stood as a Liberal.

References

External links
 

UK MPs 1857–1859
1814 births
1879 deaths
Whig (British political party) MPs for English constituencies
Members of the Parliament of the United Kingdom for Helston